"I've Got My Eyes on You" is a popular song by Jackie Rae and Les Reed, published in 1968.

The song was recorded by a number of artists:
Petula Clark (on 1971 album Warm and Tender)
Ray Conniff (Columbia single 4–44724, 1968)
P. J. Proby (on 1968 album titled What's Wrong with My World in the United States, Believe It or Not in the United Kingdom)
The Vogues (on 1969 album Till),

1968 songs
Songs written by Jackie Rae
Songs written by Les Reed (songwriter)